Gene Andrusco (April 6, 1961 – March 20, 2000), better known as Gene Eugene, was a Canadian-born actor, record producer, engineer, composer and musician. Andrusco was best known as the leader of the alternative rock band Adam Again, a member of The Swirling Eddies (credited as Prickly Disco), and as a founding member of the supergroup Lost Dogs.

References

External links 
 
 
 

Canadian record producers
20th-century Canadian male singers
Canadian rock singers
Canadian male child actors
People from Huntington Beach, California
1961 births
2000 deaths
Canadian audio engineers
Canadian performers of Christian music
People from Fort Frances
20th-century Canadian male actors
Lost Dogs members
Adam Again members
The Swirling Eddies members
Starflyer 59 members